The 10th Grey Cup was played on December 2, 1922, before 4,700 fans at Richardson Memorial Stadium at Kingston.

Queen's University defeated the Edmonton Elks 13–1.

The match was refereed by Silver Quilty.

References

External links
 
 

Grey Cup
Grey Cup
1922 in Ontario
December 1922 sports events
Queen's Golden Gaels football